Shigayevo (Şığay) is a rural locality (a selo) and the administrative centre of Shigayevsky Selsoviet, Beloretsky District, Bashkortostan, Russia. The population was 571 as of 2010. There are 12 streets.

Geography 
Shigayevo is located 39 km southwest of Beloretsk (the district's administrative centre) by road. Utkalevo is the nearest rural locality.

References 

Rural localities in Beloretsky District